The Imperfects is a superhero science fiction streaming television series created by Dennis Heaton and Shelley Eriksen that premiered on Netflix on September 8, 2022. Promoted as a "coming of rage" story (a pun on coming-of-age story), it follows three young adults pursuing the mad scientist who tampered with their DNA, resulting in disruptive superpowers. In November 2022, the series was canceled after one season.

Synopsis
Three Seattle-based adults, Abbi, a scientist, Juan, a comic book artist, and Tilda, a singer, are turned into monsters after undergoing an experimental gene therapy. The trio subsequently decides to hunt down the scientist responsible for their transformation, Dr. Alex Sarkov, and force him to make them human again. They are joined by Dr. Sydney Burke, a scientist who assists them in their quest.

Cast and characters

Main
 Italia Ricci as Dr. Sydney Burke, a scientist and the estranged former partner of Dr. Sarkov; the two worked on an synthetic stem cell project together.
 Morgan Taylor Campbell as Tilda Weber, the lead vocalist in a punk rock band who develops enhanced hearing and the powers of a banshee through sonic screams.
 Rhianna Jagpal as Abbi Singh, a genetics student who develops the powers of a succubus through pheromones that cause people to be uncontrollably attracted to and easily influenced by her.
 Iñaki Godoy as Juan Ruiz, a comic book artist who develops the powers of a chupacabra by temporarily shapeshifting.
 Kyra Zagorsky as Isabel Finch, a mysterious woman with a grudge against Dr. Sarkov
 Jedidiah Goodacre as P.J., the lead guitarist in Tilda's punk rock band and her boyfriend
 Rhys Nicholson as Dr. Alex Sarkov, a rogue scientist who unethically experimented on his patients with synthetic stem cell therapy, leading to many of them developing powers as side effects.
 Nicolson also portrays Dr. Hallenbeck, a mysterious figure connected to Dr. Sarkov
 Celina Martin as Hannah Moore, a barista and former "failed experiment" of Dr. Sarkov who didn't develop powers like the other patients

Recurring
 Junnicia Lagoutin as Darcy Cobourg, Juan's girlfriend
 Ron Selmour as Jim Sponson, a high-ranking operative for Flux tasked with hunting down Sarkov's former patients
 Rekha Sharma as Dr. Dominique Crain, chief science officer for the secret government organization known as Flux

Guest
 Max Lloyd-Jones as Doug, one of Dr. Sarkov's former patients whose side-effect power is rapid regenerative healing. He is tasked with surveilling Sarkov's other patients.
 Ben Francis as Simon, the drummer in Tilda's punk rock band
 Veronica Long as Rose, the rhythm guitarist and backup singer in Tilda's punk rock band
 John Cassini as Dr. Brian Yake, an estranged former colleague of Dr. Burke
 Kai Bradbury as Dr. Nathaniel Lang, the leader of a trio of biohackers who hunt Sarkov's former patients
 Louriza Tronco as Qamara, a biohacker working with Nathaniel
 Naika Toussaint as Melanie, a biohacker working with Nathaniel
 Wesley MacInnes as Owen Schultz, one of Dr. Sarkov's former patients whose side-effect power makes his skin invulnerable. He is also a self-declared "superhero".
 Jennifer Cheon as Sonja Benning, an operative for Flux who impersonates a law enforcement agent
 Diego Stredel as Alejandro Ruiz, Juan's estranged older brother and Paloma's father
 Danika Athenea Williston as Paloma, Juan's precocious niece and Alejandro and Renata's daughter
 Michelle Morgan as Betsy, Zoe's mother, who is searching for her missing daughter.
 MaeMae Renfrow as Zoe, one of Dr. Sarkov's former patients whose side-effect power is electrokinesis. She is unable to control her abilities, which results in the deaths of multiple people.
 Siddhartha Minhas as Ben Singh, Abbi's younger brother
 Kandyse McClure as Dr. Monday, a roboticist who develops a new advanced form of nanorobotics
 Manuela Sosa as Renata, Alejandro's wife and Paloma's mother

Episodes

Production

Development
On April 16, 2021, Netflix gave production a straight-to-series order consisting of ten episodes. The show is created by Dennis Heaton and Shelley Eriksen, who are expected to executive produce alongside Chad Oakes and Michael Frislev. Nomadic Pictures is the company involved with producing the series. The show bases the main characters' powers on those of legendary creatures, such as the banshee, succubus, and chupacabra. The series premiered on September 8, 2022. On November 8, 2022, Netflix canceled the series after one season.

Casting
Upon series-order announcement, Italia Ricci, Morgan Taylor Campbell, Rhianna Jagpal, Iñaki Godoy, Rhys Nicholson, Celina Martin, and Kyra Zagorsky were cast to star.

Notes

References

External links
 
 

2020s American drama television series
2020s American science fiction television series
2022 American television series debuts
2022 American television series endings
Coming-of-age television shows
English-language Netflix original programming
Serial drama television series
Works about legendary creatures